Naval Calling Station Luderitz is a naval station of the Namibian Navy. It is located in Luderitz on Namibia South Atlantic coast. The station was commissioned in 2007 and Commander Cristoph Moshoeshoe appointed as the first commandant.

Current Status
The station is currently active. Non of the Namibian Navy's fleet is homeported there currently. The station only serves the fleet as a refurbishment station.

Commandants

References

Military of Namibia
2007 establishments in Namibia